Dream Diary is the fourth album by Jeremy Jay, released by K Records. It was recorded at Stagg Street Studios in Los Angeles.

The album was well received by the critics. Pitchfork Media stated: "It appears to be the purest distillation of what Jay set out to do on day one". Tiny Mix Tapes hailed Dream Diary, saying : "Like Scott Walker in his early solo period, Jay is making accomplished and deeply interesting contemporary pop music while teasing the listener with seductive unfolding visions.

Dream Diary was released on vinyl and CD.

Track listing 
All tracks by Jeremy Jay

Out on the Highway		
Caught in a Whirl		
By the River's Edge		
Secret Sounds		
In the Times		
Shayla		
The Days of Casting Clouds Away		
It's Just a Walk in the Park		
Our Only Light's a Flashlight		
Whispers of the Heart		
The Dream Diary Kids		
Wild Orchids		
The Man on the Mountain

Personnel 
Jeremy Jay – guitar, keyboards, vocals, producer
Derek - Bass
Michael – Drums

References

2011 albums
Jeremy Jay albums
K Records albums